Direct Action is an independent trade union in Ukraine that pulls together students of leftist views. The union was founded in 2008 by the students of Kyiv University. Legalized on April 15, 2009, the union has its branches in a number of Kyiv universities and also in several regional centres of Ukraine.

History

A student union under the name of “Direct Action” already existed in Kyiv in the middle of the 1990s. During the time of its existence, the union succeeded in a number of actions, aimed at the protection of students' rights. These were the first attempts to raise the students' movement in Ukraine. The trade union have been existing until 1998.

In 2008, when students decided to create the new independent trade union, it was decided to take the name “Direct Action” as a sign of maintenance of youth resistance traditions. Thus, “Direct Action” of the 1990s was conventionally named “the first generation”. Some activists of the “first generation” are still contributing to the work of the trade union now.

Organization's goals
According to the “Direct Action” manifesto, the trade union is aimed at the creation of student organization from below, which is based on the horizontal principles of coordination. This organization should gradually replace the bureaucratic apparatus and form the relations in the educational sphere on the basis of equal rights, direct democracy and cooperation.

The union is fighting against the commercialization of the education, aiming at absolutely free education. At the same time, it asserts the social rights of students, which include improvement of conditions in dormitories, the rise of monthly allowances, the elimination of requisitions, student exploitation etc.

“Direct Action” advocates the principles of free (libertarian) pedagogy in the educational process. The union strives for the equal rights of the student and the lecturer, for the democratic forming of the educational programs, the facultative attendance and subjects' choice. It also supports the full secularization of science and education.

One of the main tasks of the trade union is the creation of a strong student movement, and the unity of Ukrainian and foreign liberation and emancipation movements.

Premises of the trade union's activity

“Direct Action” is based on the syndicalist principles of the direct self-governance. It is a non-leader structure. The leadership posts exist only formally – all decisions are taken on a general meeting through the procedure of reaching the consensus.

The union is called independent because it declares its full independence from political parties or commercial structures, and is not financed by the administration of the universities.

The statute of the union states that the membership in the “Direct Action” is prohibited to the people who have racist, nazi or sexist views or support any chauvinist doctrine.

Activity

From the moment of its foundation, the trade union became a member and the initiator of several campaigns devoted to the protection of students' and workers' rights.
July 2008. The first action of "Direct Action". Supporting the Rivne students, who opposed the educational payments rise, the trade union together with other organizations organized the picket of the Ministry of Education. As a result, the Rivne academies administration enters into negotiation with the students about the new prices.
September 2008. The union together with a number of other organizations conducted a number of actions against the anti-student resolutions of the new version of the law “About the Higher Education”. In particular, “Direct Action” opposed the implementation of the compulsory labour-rent for graduates. The activists negotiated with officials from the Ministry of Education and picketed the Parliament profile committee. As a result, the members of the committee flay the bill and the Ministry of Education withdraws the disputable clauses from the document
September–October 2008. Among other organisations, “Direct Action” became the initiator of the campaign against the new labour code, which substantially constricts the rights of the wage labourers. The campaign started with the opening of the big banner “NO to the new labour code” during the “Arsenal” – "Shachtar" football match. Together with other organizations the union took part in press-conferences, the picket of the Parliament profile committee, the informational campaign. The finale of the campaign was a big concert on the Khreshchatyk street “Rock Against the Official Slavery”. As an outcome, the deputies postponed the bill consideration.
November 8, 2008. The activists of the union took part in a “Social March”.
February 2009. The members of “Direct Action” accomplish the raids to the capital hospitals, where they agitate the doctors for the creation of the independent trade union branches and fighting against the implementation of the paid medicine.
April 12, 2009. The trade union took part in a social March under the slogan "It's Time to Take One's Own". About 250 activists go on a march. During the action “Direct Action” called upon the students to strive for a free education, the rise of the monthly allowances and for the direct self-government in the universities.
May 1, 2009. The alternative May demonstration. "Direct Action" together with a number of other organizations and the independent trade unions lead out to the Kyiv streets more than 400 activists with social slogans.
May–June 2009. The campaign against the implementation of paid facilities for students. The union activists try to persuade the officials to negotiate. When it doesn't work, "Direct Action" conducted meetings with the students of Kyiv universities, agitates them to go on the streets with the protest actions.
June 4, 2009. The protest action near the walls of Cabinet of Ministers. “Direct Action” together with other organizations managed to lead out on a picket of more than 150 students. During the action, the “fire” and several student record books were burned down. As a result, the students achieve the calling off of the resolution about the implementation of the paid facilities on the extraordinary session of the Cabinet of Ministers.
 October 2009. DA took an active part in a series of strike actions carried out by students and lecturers of Kyiv national Boychuk institute. Protests outside the MON (Education and science ministry ESM). The strike concluded with a notorious blockade of the institute in late October.
 17 November 2009. The «Student's Day. Break the Wall» campaign — a protest against the repressive system of education; an action of solidarity with German and Austrian students who are on strike.

Projects

The standing self-educational project exists on the basis of the union. The seminars and trainings on the natural sciences and humanities are carried out, as well as on the attainment of some practical skills. Self-educational project functions on the basis of the libertarian pedagogy – without the teachers' authoritarianism and compulsory methods.

“Direct Action” publishes the newspaper of the same name. The publication covers the trade union's activity, the international experience, the history of the student movement, the theory of the liberation movement, the counter-culture resistance. The newspaper is distributed for free in a number of capital and regional universities.

Kyiv University tensions with Student Union Priama Dija

Priama Dija (Direct Action) is a network of the independent student unions in Ukraine aimed at the creation of student organization from below. Union itself claims to be "fighting against the commercialization of the education, aiming at the absolutely free education" which, according their claims in widely distributed paper, interfere with interests of university and faculty board.

Trade union claims their activists and supporters are subject to pressure, threat of being expelled from university and interests of intelligence services members after "series of successful actions (together with other youth organizations) against the establishment of fees for previously free services in the universities, against cutting funds for scholars and against the plans to suspend scholarships for students who received even a single grade of "3"- (C)."

See also

Direct action
Visual Culture Research Center

Notes

References
"Direct Action" official site
"Direct Action" on Facebook
"Direct Action" on VK
"Direct Action" on Twitter
"Direct Action" on YouTube

Anarchist organizations in Ukraine
Direct action
Graduate school trade unions
Students' unions
Syndicalist trade unions
Trade unions established in 2008
Trade unions in Ukraine